The Twelve is an Australian television drama miniseries on Fox Showcase. The series is produced by Ian Collie, Rob Gibson and Ally Henville, with executive producers Michael Brooks and Hamish Lewis and Liz Watts.

Plot
The Twelve was based on the 2019 Belgian series De twaalf created by Sanne Nuyens and Bert Van Dael.
It follows the story of Kate Lawson, who is on trial for the alleged murder of her niece and how the twelve jurors bring their personal lives and prejudices to the courtroom.

Cast 
 Kate Mulvany as Kate Lawson
 Sam Neill as Brett Colby
 Marta Dusseldorp as Lucy Bloom
 Brendan Cowell as Garry Thorne
 Brooke Satchwell as Georgina Merrick
 Hazem Shammas as Farrad Jessim
 Pallavi Sharda as Corrie D'Souza
 Ngali Shaw as Jarrad Saunders
 Catherine Van-Davies as Vanessa Young
 Bishanyia Vincent as Lily Powell
 Damien Strouthos as Alexi Menelaus
 Nic Cassim as Simon Cavanaugh
 Daniel Mitchell as Peter Brodsky
 Gennie Nevinson as Margaret Brown
 Toby Blome as Greg
 Warren Lee as Trevor Morros
 Susan Kennedy as Melissa Curry
 Jenni Baird as Diane Lawson
 Matt Nable as Nathan Spears
 Silvia Colloca as Sonia Spears
 Coco Jack Gillies as Claire Spears
 Ben Mingay as Flip Menelaus
 Hamish Michael as Jamie Merrick
 Louisa Mignone as Detective Sam Chedid
 Charlotte Lucas as Belinda Bain
 Avishek Sharma as the judge's associate

Episodes

Reception

Critical reception
Reviews for The Twelve were generally positive. Prior to its premiere, David Knox of website, TV Tonight, rated the series at four out of five stars and praised both the adaptation and its cast, stating that "The Twelve has been entirely adapted for Australian audiences -and the results are quite fabulous." In a review from Wenlei Ma from news.com.au, she highly praised the production, commenting, "The performances and the writing are solid, the premise is compelling and the series itself has a lot of promise." Craig Mathieson of The Sydney Morning Herald gave the series three and a half stars, comparing the adaptation to the original Belgian series.

Ratings

On average, the series had a viewership of 58,000, and ranked at #3.

Awards and nominations

References

External links

2022 Australian television series debuts
2022 Australian television series endings
English-language television shows
Showcase (Australian TV channel) original programming
Television series by Warner Bros. Television Studios
Australian television miniseries